Hemispheres is a news and current affairs program, co-produced by the Australian Broadcasting Corporation (ABC) and the Canadian Broadcasting Corporation (CBC). Its main focus was foreign events and international issues, using ABC and CBC correspondents from around the world. The program debuted in 2005.

It aired on the Australia Network and CBC Newsworld channels, as well as on ABC2 in Australia, but not on the main free-to-air ABC and CBC channels.

It was presented by CBC News anchor Ian Hanomansing from Vancouver, and ABC News presenter Felicity Davey in Sydney.

References

See also 
 List of Australian television series
 List of English-language Canadian television series

2000s Australian television series
2005 Australian television series debuts
[[Category:2000s Canadian television news shows
2005 Canadian television series debuts
Television shows filmed in Vancouver
Television shows set in Melbourne
Year of Canadian television series ending missing
Australian non-fiction television series
Australia–Canada relations
CBC News Network original programming
CBC News
ABC News and Current Affairs